Zamgah Zich (also Romanized as Zamgah Zīch) is a village in Itivand-e Jonubi Rural District, Kakavand District, Delfan County, Lorestan Province, Iran. At the 2006 census, its population was 24, in 5 families.

References 

Towns and villages in Delfan County